Margaret Osborn (born 23 August 1988), known professionally as Alice Glass, is a Canadian singer and songwriter. She is the co-founder and former frontwoman of the electronic band Crystal Castles. In 2014, she embarked on a solo career. She released her eponymous debut EP in 2017. Her solo debut album, Prey//IV, was released in February 2022.

Life and career

1988–2014: Early life and Crystal Castles
Alice Glass was born Margaret Osborn on 25 August 1988 in Toronto, Ontario. She was raised Catholic, attending parochial school up until junior high. At age 15, she ran away from home to live in a squat community of punks under the name Vicki Vale (after the comic book character) and started an all-girl experimental punk band called Fetus Fatale. In December 2003, she and Ethan Kath began working together on the project that would become Crystal Castles. She picked the stage name Alice Glass based on a pin with the name Alice that she shoplifted and Hopey Glass, a character in Love and Rockets.

Crystal Castles' first official release was their 2006 single "Alice Practice". The song got the band their first record deal with Merok Records in London. The same year, Crystal Castles played their first live show at Clinton's Tavern in Toronto. "Alice Practice" was eventually featured on their eponymous debut album released in 2008. Glass topped NMEs Cool List that year and responded to it by criticizing the idea of the cool list itself. The duo followed their debut album with two more critically acclaimed albums, II (2010) and III (2012), completing a trilogy. Glass co-wrote every Crystal Castles song she contributed vocals to. In October 2014, Glass announced her departure from Crystal Castles due to her own professional and personal reasons. In the announcement, she noted that working within the band compromised her efforts towards "sincerity, honesty, and empathy for others". She later had a number of public disagreements with her former bandmate, including accusing him of assault and sexual misconduct.

2015–2017: Alice Glass and lawsuit
In July 2015, Glass released her debut single as a solo artist, "Stillbirth". The release was largely an effort to increase awareness of domestic and sexual abuse. Glass worked with anti-sexual assault organization RAINN to donate all proceeds from the song's revenue to aid abuse victims.

In August 2017, Glass released "Without Love", which served as the lead single to her eponymous debut EP which was released the following week. She headed on tour with Marilyn Manson following the release of the EP.

In October 2017, Glass posted a statement on her official website explaining her departure from Crystal Castles, accusing co-founder Ethan Kath of sexual, physical, and mental abuse. The accusations detail the abuse starting when Glass was 15 and began recording with Kath and escalated until her eventual departure from Crystal Castles. Kath responded the same day in a statement issued to Pitchfork through his attorney, where he called the accusations "pure fiction" and said he was consulting with his lawyers as to his legal options. The following month, Kath sued Glass for defamation, but was dismissed in February 2018. In May, Glass was awarded nearly US$21,000 in attorney fees after Kath's lawyers sought to vacate the dismissal of his defamation lawsuit against Glass.

2018–2020: Non-album single releases
In January 2018, Glass released "Forgiveness" as the second single from her EP. She also released that month a brand new single called "Cease and Desist", which she said "is a call to arms for all survivors." Both singles were accompanied by music videos.

In April 2018, Glass embarked on her SnowBlood Tour alongside American singer Zola Jesus, with electronic musician Pictureplane being an opening act on select dates. The tour is named after Lady Snowblood, spurned star of the eponymous 1973 Japanese film. Later that month, Glass released a remix EP, consisting of remixes of songs from her eponymous EP released in 2017. The EP includes remixes from both Zola Jesus and Pictureplane.

In June 2018, Glass released a new single, "Mine", accompanied by a music video directed by Lucas David and starring American drag queen Violet Chachki. In December, Glass was featured on Adult Swim's singles series with a new song titled "I Trusted You".

In 2020, Glass revealed that she received little royalties from her work in Crystal Castles. She disavowed her tenure in the band and asked fans to cease their support of the group.

2021–present: Prey//IV
Glass released the single "Suffer and Swallow" on 6 January 2021, which was the first song she shared from her long-awaited solo debut album which she said was to be released later that year. The song was accompanied by a stop-motion music video by Lucas David. She had a guest appearance on Alice Longyu Gao's single "Legend" which was released on 27 May 2021.

On 19 November 2021, Glass unveiled the title and shared the track listing of her solo debut album Prey//IV and announced a release date of 28 January 2022 by her own Eating Glass Records. The announcement was accompanied the single "Baby Teeth", which had by a music video by Astra Zero and Lucas David.

On 8 December 2021, Glass premiered the single "Fair Game" accompanied by a music video directed by Bryan M. Ferguson

On 28 January 2022, Glass released "Love Is Violence", after the album's release was delayed to February. The single was accompanied by a gory music video by Bryan M. Ferguson. The early 2000s-inspired video depicts two teenagers who sensually pull out each other's entrails.

On 21 September 2022, Glass released a new single, "Lips Apart".

Solo discography

Studio albums

Extended plays

Remix EPs

Singles

Guest appearances

Music videos

References

External links

 Interview with the Independent newspaper

1988 births
21st-century Canadian women singers
Canadian people of Irish descent
Canadian electronic musicians
Canadian women singer-songwriters
Canadian singer-songwriters
Canadian feminists
Crystal Castles (band) members
Feminist musicians
Living people
Musicians from Toronto
Political music artists
20th-century squatters
Canadian women in electronic music